National Route 173 is a national highway of Japan connecting Ikeda, Osaka and Ayabe, Kyoto in Japan, with a total length of 72.4 km (44.99 mi).

History
Route 173 originally ran from Osaka to Kobe. This was redesignated as Route 43 in 1958. The current Route 173 was designated in 1963 from Ikeda to Mizhuo, replacing a section of Route 9 when it was rerouted. On 1 April 1975 Route 173 was extended over a section of Route 43 to Ayabe.

References

National highways in Japan
Roads in Hyōgo Prefecture
Roads in Kyoto Prefecture
Roads in Osaka Prefecture